Ines Castellani Fantoni Benaglio, also known by the pseudonym of Memini (1849 Pavia - 6 May 1897 Azzate), was an Italian writer.

She lived in Florence and Milan. She made her debut as a writer in 1880, with Estella and Nemorino.

She wrote for magazines,  including Perseveranza, La Gazzetta Provinciale and Vita Intimate.

She wrote numerous novels, which attracted the attention of Anna Radius Zuccari, and they were friends. She married the poet Luigi Benaglio.

Works 
 Fra quadri e statue (1882), 
 Mia (1884), 
 La marchesa d’Arcello (1886), 
 Mario (1887), 
 Un tramonto ed altri racconti e Le Perichole (1888), 
 Anime liete (1889), 
 Vita mondana (1891), 
 Ultima primavera (1894), 
 Milla d’Astianello (1895), 
 Maria d’Ardeano e Carina d’Orno (1896).

References 

1849 births
1897 deaths
Italian writers
19th-century pseudonymous writers
Pseudonymous women writers